United Midwestern Promoters (UMP) is a short track motor racing sanctioning body in the United States that sanctions short track racing on dirt race tracks from 1/5 mile (0.3 km) in length to  in length. UMP currently sanctions eight different racing divisions on over 100 tracks in 19 states and one province in Canada. UMP was created in 1984 by Bob Memmer.

Classes 
UMP began by sanctioning UMP Late Model and UMP Modified cars.  UMP Modified cars are quite similar in appearance to IMCA Modified cars.

UMP reorganized their class system in 2007 by sanctioning one new class.  The revised class system included: UMP Super Late Models, UMP Modifieds, UMP Pro(Crate) Late Models, UMP Limited Modifieds, UMP Sportsman, and UMP Street Stocks, UMP Factory Stocks,& UMP 4 Cylinders. UMP announced in late November 2007 that the sanctioning body will add one more class: UMP Pro (Crate) Late Model.

UMP Weekly Racing Divisions 
UMP Late Models
UMP Modifieds
UMP Pro (Crate) Late Models
UMP Limited Modifieds
UMP Sportsman
UMP Street Stocks
UMP Factory Stocks
UMP 4 Cylinders Pure Stocks

UMP DIRTcar Sanctioned Touring Series
UMP DIRTcar currently sanctions  different touring series.
 UMP DIRTcar Late Model Summer Nationals
 UMP DIRTcar Northern All-Stars Late Model Series (CoC/NALMS)
 UMP DIRTcar American Late Model Series (ALMS)
 UMP DIRTcar Mid-American Racing Series (MARS)
 UMP DIRTcar Southwest Dirt Racing Association (SWDRA)
 UMP DIRTcar Western All-Stars Super Late Model Series (WAS)
 UMP DIRTcar AllState Dirt Late-Model Racing Association (DLRA)
 UMP DIRTcar Ontario(Canada)Dirt Late Model Series (ODLMS)
 UMP DIRTcar Modified Wolfpack Series

Points System
UMP has a base points system for all its sanctioned tracks and is the same for each of its seven classes.

If a track has 20 or fewer cars they will receive the base points. Every car over 20 increases the bonus points awarded. The bonus points are one extra point for every car in that division over 20. So if an event has 20 entries, then the winner gets 75 points. With 32 entries, the winner gets 75 + 12 bonus points for a total of 87 points. Every car in the feature that night receives 12 extra points. Any car that does not make the feature will receive 10 points regardless of how many cars are there.

Replacement races are based on where drivers finish, not on how many cars there are. There is a cap on points. The most points a feature winner can get is 90 points.

Bonus Points= 1 point for every car in the pits over 20 in their division in the pits that night.

UMP Racing Points Breakdown for all eight UMP racing divisions.
1st-75, 2nd-70, 3rd-65, 4th-60, 5th-58, 6th-56, 7th-54, 8th-52, 9th-50 10th-48, 11th-46, 12th-44, 13th-42, 14th-40, 15th 38, 16th-36, 17th-34, 18th-32, 19th-30, 20th-28, 21st-26, 22nd-24, 23rd-22, 24th-20.

UMP DIRTcar Late Model National champions

Year: Champion, Hometown

1984 Gary Webb; Blue Grass, Iowa
1985 Gary Webb; Blue Grass, Iowa
1986 John Gill; Mitchell, Indiana
1987 John Gill; Mitchell, Indiana
1988 Jim Curry; Norman, Indiana
1989 Jim Leka; Buffalo, Illinois
1990 Bob Pierce; Danville, Illinois
1991 Kevin Claycomb; Vincennes, Indiana
1992 Kevin Weaver; Gibson City, Illinois
1993 Randy Sellars; Mayfield, Kentucky
1994 Ed Dixon; Washington, Missouri
1995 Tony Izzo Jr.; Bridgeview, Illinois
1996 Donnie Tudor; Shawneetown, Illinois
1997 Randy Korte; Highland, Illinois
1998 Mark Faust; Breese, Illinois
1999 Ed Dixon; Washington, Missouri
2000 Ed Dixon; Washington, Missouri
2001 Rodney Melvin; Benton, Illinois
2002 Terry English; Benton, Kentucky
2003 Rodney Melvin; Benton, Illinois
2004 Rodney Melvin; Benton, Illinois
2005 Rodney Melvin; Benton, Illinois
2006 Randy Korte; Highland, Illinois
2007 Dennis Erb Jr.; Carpentersville, Illinois
2008 Dennis Erb Jr.; Carpentersville, Illinois
2009 Jason Feger; Bloomington, Illinois
2010 Rusty Schlenk; Jackson, Michigan
2011 Ryan Unzicker; El Paso, Illinois
2012 Brian Shirley; Chatham, Illinois
2013 Brandon Sheppard; New Berlin, Illinois 
2014 Bobby Pierce; Oakwood, Illinois
2015 Bobby Pierce; Oakwood, Illinois
2016 Bobby Pierce; Oakwood, Illinois
2017 Rusty Schlenk; McClure, Ohio

UMP Summernationals Champions

Year: Champion, Hometown

1986: John Gill, Mitchell, IN.
1987: Rick Standridge, Divernon, IL.
1988: Pete Parker, Kaukauna, WI.
1989: John Gill, Mitchell, IN.
1990: Scott Bloomquist, Mooresburg, TN.
1991: Scott Bloomquist, Mooresburg, TN.
1992: Bob Pierce, Danville, IL.
1993: Billy Moyer, Batesville, AR.
1994: Billy Moyer, Batesville, AR.
1995: Bob Pierce, Danville, IL.
1996: Billy Moyer, Batesville, AR.
1997: Rick Aukland, Fargo, ND.
1998: Rick Aukland, Fargo, ND.
1999: Billy Moyer, Batesville, AR.
2000: Kevin Weaver, Gibson City, IL.
2001: Billy Moyer, Batesville, AR.
2002: Scott Bloomquist, Mooresburg, TN.
2003: Billy Moyer, Batesville, AR.
2004: Don O'Neal, Martinsville, IN.
2005: Shannon Babb, Moweaqua, IL.
2006: Shannon Babb, Moweaqua, IL.
2007: Dennis Erb Jr., Carpentersville, IL.
2008: Dennis Erb Jr., Carpentersville, IL.
2009: Dennis Erb Jr., Carpentersville, IL.
2010: Jason Feger, Bloomington, IL.
2011: Shannon Babb, Moweaqua, IL.
2012: Brian Shirley, Chatham, IL.
2013: Brandon Sheppard, New Berlin, IL.
2014: Shannon Babb, Moweaqua, IL.
2015: Bobby Pierce, Oakwood, IL.
2016: Bobby Pierce, Oakwood, IL.
2017: Bobby Pierce, Oakwood, IL.

UMP Sanctioned Tracks
There are currently over 100 UMP sanctioned track in 19 United States states and two tracks in the Canadian province of Ontario. States currently with a UMP sanctioned race track include: Alabama, California, Colorado, Florida, Georgia, Illinois, Indiana, Iowa, Kentucky, Louisiana, Michigan, Mississippi, Missouri, New York, Ohio, Oregon, Pennsylvania, South Carolina, & Texas.

UMP Sanctioned Tracks in California

UMP Sanctioned Tracks in Colorado

UMP Sanctioned Tracks in Florida

UMP Sanctioned Tracks in Georgia

UMP Sanctioned Tracks in Illinois

UMP Sanctioned Tracks in Ohio

References

External links

Official website
2006 UMP banquet announcement

Auto racing organizations in the United States
Stock car racing